Abdallah ibn Rashid ibn Kawus was the Abbasid governor of Tarsus and the Cilician borderlands (ath-thughur ash-Shamiya) between the Abbasid Caliphate and the Byzantine Empire in ca. 878.

In summer 878, he led 4,000 men in one of the customary raids (ṣā'ifa) against the Byzantine frontier provinces. He first marched against the forts of al-Hasin and al-Maskanin, taking much booty. As he turned back, however, he was encircled in the area of Podandos by the assembled forces of the Byzantine commands of Seleucia, Pisidia, Qurra (Koron), Kawkab (unidentified) and Harshana (Charsianon). The ensuing battle was a disaster for the Muslims, only 500 or 600 of whom survived it; Abdallah himself was heavily wounded and taken prisoner to Emperor Basil I the Macedonian in Constantinople. This battle is probably to be equated with the defeat of the unnamed "Emir of Tarsus" by the Domestic of the Schools Andrew the Scythian mentioned for about the same period by the Byzantine sources.

At about the time of Abdallah's capture, control over the Cilician marches, as with the rest of Syria, passed from the Abbasid central government to the ambitious autonomous ruler of Egypt, Ahmad ibn Tulun, who appointed a certain Takhshi to succeed Abdallah. In the next year, Emperor Basil sent Abdallah as a gift, alongside other Muslim prisoners and several captured copies of the Quran to Ahmad ibn Tulun.

References

Citations

Works cited
 
 

9th-century births
Abbasid governors of Tarsus
Abbasid people of the Arab–Byzantine wars
Prisoners of war held by the Byzantine Empire